Cyanopsis may be:
 a synonym for Volutaria, a genus of flowering plants
 the name of a genus of Tachinid flies

See also 
 Cyanopis, another genus of flowering plants
 Cyanopsia, a medial condition also known as "blue vision"